Magà Ettori (born 15 February 1972) is a French filmmaker who lives in Dublin, Ireland. Married with two children, he married in London for mayor of Westminster. He did his cinema studies in France at Ecole Supérieure de Réalisation Audiovisuelle (ESRA), journalism at the Centre Professionnel de Journalisme (CFJ), languages (Cambridge University) and dramatic arts (Conservatoire Maurice Ravel).
In 1990, Magà founded and directed "l'Institut Citoyen du Cinéma" which had a goal of supporting politically motivated films. That same year, - at the request of Antoine Bonfanti- he made "Domotica" with Jean Lefebvre as the main actor.
In 2011, Magà Ettori was elected Cinema Advisor at the Conseil Economique Social et Culturel Corse (CESCC). He became involved in the development of New Emerging Cinema in the Mediterranean region with the Anna Lindh Foundation.
From the beginning of his career, Magà Ettori wrote and directed several dozen films. He also created a cultural magazine and a Contemporary Art gallery in Ajaccio which was a double project awarded by the Ministry of Youth and Sports. Magà Ettori who defines himself as a citizen of the world and a humanist, became vegan in 2012. Along with his cinematographic career, Magà Ettori hosted numerous trainings, conferences, festivals, debates, master classes, workshops and meetings, three colloquiums in the Senate, and one at UNESCO headquarters. He also steered the "Convention of the Animal Rights Activists" and the "Convention of Corsican Culture". Faeryland, of which he is author, director and performer, is considered to be the first vegan film.

Awards 
 Medor for Best film (2016) (:fr:Faeryland) – won

Films 

 1990: Domotica
 1991: Carrissimu cucinu
 1993: A mio culomba
 1993: Ribeddu
 1994: Nine Sisters
 1995: OE
 1996: Corsica Sensations
 1998: Croce
 1999: L'occhju
 2000: Pampasgiolu
 2001: AE
 2002: Fiat Lux
 2003: A dream
 2003: Clandestinu
 2003: Corsica Regina
 2004: Resistenza
 2004: The Soul
 2005: Pulitichella
 2006: A mimoria
 2006: Babel
 2008: Et maintenant monsieur Paoli ?
 2009: Grossu Minutu
 2009: U borgu
 2010: L'étrangère
 2011: I Tercani
 2011: La Marche de l'enfant roi
 2011: Lamentu di u Golu
 2012: l'Astiu
 2014: Amazing Grace
 2014: Bad Day
 2014: Le Dernier Clan
 2014: Umani
 2015: Corsica Sera
 2016: Faeryland

External links 
 
 Allociné

http://letstalkaboutcorsica.com/whatwhere-faeryland-prepared-enter-enchanted-world-maga-ettori
http://anoliemagazine.com/maga-ettori-the-man-who-dreamed-of-faeryland
http://letstalkaboutcorsica.com/vegan-marathon-maga-ettori-ready-challenge

1972 births
Living people
French expatriates in Ireland